Cristo Rei (Portuguese, 'Christ the King'), officially Cristo Rei Administrative Post, is an administrative post (and was formerly a subdistrict) in Dili municipality, East Timor.

References

External links 

  – information page on Ministry of State Administration site 

Administrative posts of East Timor
Dili Municipality